is a passenger railway station located in the city of Himeji, Hyōgo Prefecture, Japan, operated by the West Japan Railway Company (JR West). The station was opened on March 1, 2005, on the north-east side of Himeji Freight Station (姫路貨物駅) operated by Japan Freight Railway Company (JR Freight).

Lines

Station layout
The station consists of two ground-level side platforms connected by a footbridge. The station is staffed.

Platforms

History
Himeji-Bessho Station was opened on 1 March 2005 as an infill station.

Station numbering was introduced in March 2018 with Himeji-Bessho being assigned station number JR-A82.

Passenger statistics
In fiscal 2019, the station was used by an average of 1924 passengers daily

Surrounding area
 Japan National Route 2
 Himeji City Higashi Junior High School
 Hyogo Prefectural Himeji Bessho High School
 Hakuryo Junior and Senior High School

See also
List of railway stations in Japan

References

External links

 JR West Station Official Site

Railway stations in Himeji
Sanyō Main Line
Railway stations in Japan opened in 2005